"Broken Strings" is the second single by British musician James Morrison from his second studio album, Songs for You, Truths for Me, and was released in December 2008. The song is a duet with Canadian singer-songwriter Nelly Furtado. The single became Morrison's most successful single to date, peaking at number two on the UK Singles Chart in January 2009, as well as in the top ten on many other European charts while topping the charts in Germany and Switzerland. It was featured in episode 16 of the second season of the American television drama The Vampire Diaries.

When the album was released in Japan in March 2009, "Broken Strings" was re-recorded as a duet with R&B singer Ai replacing Furtado, as a bonus track. A remix of the song, "Broken Strings (Kocky and Trash Remix)," was featured on Ai's album Viva Ai (2009).

Reception
The song received generally positive reviews from critics. According to Michael Menachem from Billboard,

Girls Aloud performed a cover of the song at their Out of Control Tour in 2009, and JLS performed a cover of the song in their ITV Christmas special in 2010, later appearing as the B-Side to their single "Eyes Wide Shut".

Chart performance
"Broken Strings" was released as the second single from Songs for You, Truths for Me. The track was released in November 2008. It entered the UK Singles Chart at number seventy-three and slowly rose for four weeks before, following a performance of the song with Girls Aloud on The Girls Aloud Party, broke into the top ten at number six, giving Morrison his fourth top ten hit. The following week the song rose to a new high, rising to number four on the 2008 Christmas chart. This makes Broken Strings Morrison's most successful single by peak position to date in the UK as, on 11 January 2009 it climbed to number two, but it failed to crack the #1 spot by Lady Gaga's major hit Just Dance. In the week ending 30 January, it reached #1 in Germany marking his first #1 in the country and Nelly Furtado's second. On the issue date 21 February 2009 the song reached at number 1 on the European Hot 100 becoming his first number one single on that chart and Furtado's third. In Canada it debuted at #95 on the Canadian Hot 100 and rose to number #41.

In Japan, the version sung with Ai was released to airplay in March 2009, reaching number 19 on the Billboard Japan Hot 100.

It ended up selling 850,000 copies in the UK.

Music video
A music video in support of "Broken Strings" made its world premiere on 17 November 2008. Directed by Micah Meisner, the video features James Morrison performing the track, with Nelly Furtado also making an appearance. Parts of the video are inspired by the film Paris, Texas, while scenes where reversed explosions occur are inspired by the film Insignificance. Furtado and Morrison filmed their parts on different days.
In the video, Morrison is in a hotel room and Furtado is behind a glass window of an adjointed room. Morrison starts to sing the song and when Furtado starts to sing her part behind the glass window, things begin to break, such as Morrison's guitar, the hotel room's television and more.
When the video is ending, everything that is broken goes back to normal and Furtado disappears.

Formats and track listings
CD single
 "Broken Strings" (featuring Nelly Furtado)
 "Say It All Over Again"

Maxi-CD single
 "Broken Strings" (featuring Nelly Furtado)
 "Say It All Over Again"
 "Broken Strings" (Live At Air Studios)
 "You Make It Real" (Live At Air Studios)
 "Broken Strings" (Video)

Promo CD single
 "Broken Strings" (Remix) (featuring Nelly Furtado)
 "Broken Strings" (featuring Nelly Furtado)
Japan CD single

 "Broken Strings" (featuring Ai)

Charts

Weekly charts

Year-end charts

Decade-end charts

Certifications

References

2000s ballads
2008 singles
2008 songs
Ai (singer) songs
European Hot 100 Singles number-one singles
James Morrison (singer) songs
Male–female vocal duets
Music videos directed by Aaron A
Nelly Furtado songs
Number-one singles in Germany
Number-one singles in Switzerland
Polydor Records singles
Song recordings produced by Mark Taylor (record producer)
Songs written by Fraser T. Smith
Songs written by James Morrison (singer)
Songs written by Nina Woodford
Ultratop 50 Singles (Wallonia) number-one singles